Pasir Gudang is a city in Johor Bahru District, Johor, Malaysia. The main industries are transportation and logistics, shipbuilding, petrochemicals and other heavy industries, and oil palm storage and distribution, which is located in Johor Port and Tanjung Langsat.

History
Established in 1918, Pasir Gudang, which was formerly known as Kampung Pasir Udang, was founded by Long Abu who is believed to have originated from Riau, Indonesia. Four more villages were established by the expanded population of about 83 families.

Kampung Pasir Gudang Baru. (known as Kampung Pasir Gudang Lama located at TNB Sultan Iskandar Power Station)
Kampung Sungai Perembi. (currently the Pasir Gudang Police Station)
Kampung Ulu (currently MSE dockyard)
Kampung Tengah (currently the Tenaga Nasional area)
Kampung Hilir.

In 1920, 4 more villages were established :

Kampung Air Biru (now the port).
Kampung Pasir Merah (now the port).
Kampung Pasir Puteh, which is still in existence today.
Kampung Pulau Tekong, now the territory of Singapore.

The name Pasir Gudang originated from the existence of a sand mine at Kampung Ulu. Sand or 'pasir' in Malay are dug and stocked in sand pits/stores or 'gudang' in Malay, to be exported to Singapore, hence the name 'Pasir Gudang'.

The surrounding areas further inland were developed in the mid-19th century by Chinese travellers of the Teochew clan. Issuance of the 'river deed' by the Sultan of Johore allowed them to develop the Kangkar Masai, Kangkar Plentong and Kangkar Lunchu areas under riverheads known as 'kangchus'. It was on these riverbeds that they cultivated catechu and black pepper. Falling catechu and black pepper prices forced some estate owners to cultivate pineapples.

The introduction of rubber into Malaysia in the early 20th century resulted in the opening of big estates by the British and Singaporean cultivators. Up till 1916, six estates covering an area of 15,000 acres (61 km2) were opened in the Mukim of Plentong. In 1916, Kampung Pasir Gudang became the centre for Police, Customs and opium-control besides being a centre for the 'penghulu' of the Mukim of Pasir Gudang. The formation of estates had also resulted in influx of labourers from China and India.

The Japanese occupation during the Second World War and guerrilla movements after the war did not have much effect on the agricultural activities here. Under the Emergency Law in the 1950s, new villages were set up at Plentong, Masai, Johor and Pasir Gudang. The estate labourers were either placed in these new villages or at guarded estate barracks.

Land schemes under the FELDA scheme were founded in Ban Foo, Plentong Baru and Felda Cahaya Baru after 1969. To further develop Johor, the State Government further took the estate lands to be converted into industrial and housing areas to the develop Pasir Gudang into an industrial area.

On 1 July 2008, Pasir Gudang Municipal Council was established. On 22 November 2020, the municipal council was upgraded to Pasir Gudang City Council (}).

Government

Pasir Gudang is administered by the Pasir Gudang Local Authority, or Pihak Berkuasa Tempatan Pasir Gudang, a subsidiary of Johor Corporation. It is the first local authority in Malaysia that was privatised, although Johor Corporation is the investment arm of the Johor State Government.

On 1 July 2008, this city was granted municipal status and henceforth changed its name to Pasir Gudang Municipal Council. 

At 2015, the administration zone of Pasir Gudang Municipal Council was increase from 29,459.9ha to 31,732.24ha following the re-delineation exercise.  This brought Masai and Bandar Seri Alam become a part of Pasir Gudang.

On 22 November 2020, it was granted the city status and henceforth changed its name to Pasir Gudang City Council. The title of leader of Pasir Gudang was also changed, as Mayor.

Demographics 
As of 2020, the area of Pasir Gudang has a population of 312,437.

The following is based on Department of Statistics Malaysia 2010 census.

Economy
The main economy sectors of the city are transportation, logistics, shipbuilding, petrochemicals and other heavy industries.

Education

The Politeknik Ibrahim Sultan (PIS), Pasir Gudang Community College, Institut Latihan Perindustrian Pasir Gudang and Johor Skills Development Centre (PUSPATRI) are the major higher institutes located at Pasir Gudang. Not only that, the “City of Knowledge”－Bandar Seri Alam  houses a number of higher institutions including Universiti Teknologi Mara (UiTM) campus, Universiti Kuala Lumpur (UniKL) campus, the Masterskill University College of Health Sciences campus and other international schools. The Foon Yew High School second branch (Bandar Seri Alam Campus) and the Lee Chong Wei Badminton Academy are still construction.

Infrastructure

Energy
It is the site of one of two major power stations in the state of Johor, the Sultan Iskandar Power Station.

Healthcare
There are 4 hospitals in the area which are KPJ Pasir Gudang Specialist Hospital, Hospital Penawar, Regency Specialist Hospital and the upcoming Pasir Gudang Hospital. The latter two are located in Seri Alam

Tourist attraction

Pasir Gudang Kite Museum is located here, on top of Kite Hill. It is the first kite museum in Malaysia and has a unique working windmill whose mechanism works to generate enough electricity to supply the daily needs of the museum. It also hosts the annual Pasir Gudang International Kite Festival since 1995.

Sports

Pasir Gudang Corporation Stadium is a multi-use stadium and it has both an indoor stadium within its compound. The outdoor stadium can hold a maximum of 15,000 people and is currently used mostly for football matches, serving as the home stadium to Johor in the Malaysia Premier League, President Cup, Malaysia and Harimau Muda B in the S. League.

The 3.86 km Johor Racing Circuit is located here, which formerly hosted one of the legs of the World Motorcycle Championship, being one of only two legs held in Asia.

Pasir Gudang has one golf course, the Tanjung Puteri Golf Resort. It has an area of 8.3 km2 and 3 courses named Plantation, Village and Straits.

Transportation

Sea
The town consists of two ports, which are Tanjung Langsat Port and Johor Port. Johor Port is one of the country's most important seaports for commodities and mineral resources shipping, as Johor is home to a large number of major commercial plantations. The port is also the location of the majority of Malaysia's resources refineries.

The Pasir Gudang Ferry Terminal is also located in Pasir Gudang and has passenger ferry services to Batam in the Riau Islands Province of Indonesia.

Road
Pasir Gudang is connected by the 6-lane Federal Route 17 Pasir Gudang Highway, the 4-lane Johor Bahru East Coast Parkway, and a railway line to Kempas Bahru railway station. The Senai-Desaru Expressway also through here and the interchange was at Cahaya Baru and Pasir Gudang Highway. The public bus service also available here.

See also
 Iskandar Puteri

References

External links 

Pasir Gudang Municipal Council

 
Indonesia–Malaysia border crossings